Lacing or cutting, are drug slangs for the act of using a substance (referred to by the slang terms lacing agent or cutting agent) to adulterate substances independent of the reason. The resulting substance are refereed by the slang terms laced or cut.

Some street drugs are commonly laced with other chemicals for various reasons, but it is most commonly done so as to bulk up the original product or to sell other, cheaper drugs in the place of something more expensive.  Individuals sometimes lace their own drugs with another substance to combine or alter the physiological or psychoactive effects.

Overview 
The classical model of drug cutting refers to the way that illicit drugs were diluted at each stage of the chain of distribution.

Drug markets have changed considerably since the 1980s; greater competition, and a shift from highly structured (and thus controlled) to greatly fragmented markets, has generated competition among dealers in terms of purity. Many drugs that reach the street are now only cut at the manufacture/producer stage, and this may be more a matter of lacing the drug with another substance designed to appeal to the consumer, as opposed to simple diluents that increase the profit for the seller. The extent of cutting can vary significantly over time but for the last 15 years drugs such as heroin and cocaine have often sat at the 50% purity level. Heroin purity sitting at 50% does not mean 50% cutting agents; other adulterants could include other opiate by-products of making heroin from opium. Coomber, after having street heroin seizures from the UK re-analysed, reported that nearly 50% of the samples had no cutting agents present at all. This means that 50% of street heroin in the UK in 1995 had worked its way from producer to user without being cut at any stage, although other adulterants may have been present. Other research outlined how drug dealers have other ways of making profit without having to resort to cutting the drugs they sell.

Cocaine has been cut with various substances ranging from flour and powdered milk to ground drywall, mannitol, baking soda, and other common, easily obtainable substances.

Most hard drugs are adulterated to some degree. Some street drugs can be as low as 10–15% of the active drug, with the other (85–90%) not necessarily being the cutting agent. In fact a heroin sample of only 20% purity may have no cutting agents in it at all. The other 80% may be impurities produced in the manufacturing process and substances created as by products of this process and/or degradation of the drug if improperly stored.

When choosing a cutting agent, the drug manufacturer or dealer would ideally attempt to find a chemical that is inexpensive, easy to obtain, relatively non-toxic, and mimics the physical attributes of the drug to be adulterated. For example, if a drug is soluble in water, the preferred adulterant would also be water-soluble. Similar melting and boiling points are also important if the drug is to be smoked.

Types of lacing agents

Non-psychoactive lacing agents

Visually mimics
Some fake drugs consist of substances from relatively harmless sources, such as grocery store goods like flour, oregano or allergy pills. Even despite the substances' harmlessness, legal penalties for the crime of selling them can include time in jail.

Flavor masker

Sometimes a flavor masker are added to give a more pleasant experience.

Psychoactive mimics
Lacing/cutting agents may be psychoactive.

Certain fake drugs include other controlled drugs, or they may include synthetic drugs with similar properties. Uncertainty of an identity of the substance may increase the risk of an overdose.

A related, yet distinct, problem is the trade of counterfeit medications with pills including substances such as fentanyl which can be used recreationally.

Reasons for lacing

Illegal drug trade

Drugs may be sold to end users who are unaware they have been laced or are unaware what was used to lace them. At various points in the supply chain, in order to maximize profitability, many drugs are adulterated with cutting agents. Substances with similar physical and/or chemical properties can be used so the end product most closely resembles what it is purported to be.  Inert substances with similar physical properties can be used to increase weight without changing the look and feel.  Less expensive or easier to obtain compounds with similar chemical properties may be used to lace heavily adulterated drugs while still maintaining some psychoactive potency.

Mickey Finn

In slang, a Mickey Finn—or simply a Mickey—is a drink laced with a psychoactive drug or incapacitating agent (especially chloral hydrate) given to someone without their knowledge, with intent to incapacitate them.

Poly drug use

Drugs may also be laced with the end user being made aware of the lacing. In this case, rather than as an adulteration, the lacing is intended to make the product more desirable. Sometimes less potent, often less expensive drugs, are laced with a small amount of a more potent, often more expensive drug. This may be used to facilitate the ingestion of drugs or to allow the simultaneous ingestion of multiple drugs. Cigarettes laced with PCP allow users to  take in the liquid PCP through smoking and some multi drug users report intentionally buying marijuana laced with methamphetamine.

Commonly laced substances

Dietary supplements

CBD
 Cannabidiol (CBD) is often cut with synthetic cannabinoids.

Street drugs

Depressants

Heroin
Heroin is commonly cut with quinine, caffeine, dimethocaine, lidocaine procaine, lactose, inositol, dextrose, mannitol, and starch.

Other opioids are sometimes sold as heroin or cut with heroin. Fentanyl sold as or laced into heroin has made the news in the past due to the numerous fatalities it causes when it appears on the market. Recently, Fentanyl and close analogues have been produced in pure powder form for very cheap. Dealers may cut with or sell heroin with Fentanyl due to the street cost of Fentanyl versus the cost of heroin. The potency of such mixtures (especially if made carelessly) can be far above that of pure heroin, and users frequently overdose due to this. Gray death is a street drug in the United States. Samples have been found to contain the designer drug U-47700, heroin and opioids including fentanyl and carfentanil.

Stimulants
Stimulants are drugs that speed or give a mental boost to the consumer.

Cocaine
Black cocaine, and cocaine paste, are impure forms of cocaine.

The most common cocaine adulterants found in 1998 in samples in Rome, Italy were lidocaine and caffeine. Cocaine is sometimes mixed with methylamphetamine, methylphenidate, and ephedrine, but is usually mixed with non psychoactive chemicals such as mannitol, inositol, pectin, glucose, lactose, saccharin, white rice flour, and maltodextrin. Other 
of agranulocytosis, including 2 deaths, according to an alert from the Substance Abuse and Mental Health Services Administration (SAMHSA).

The emergence of fentanyl-laced cocaine has led to an increase in cocaine overdose fatalities in New York City.

Methamphetamine
MSM is sometimes used as a cutting agent for illicitly manufactured methamphetamine.

Psychedelics

Cannabis
Cannabis products that are laced are usually laced with synthetic cannabinoids:
 Counterfeit cannabis-liquid (c-liquid) for e-cigarettes: Synthetic cannabinoids are increasingly offered in e-cigarette form as "c-liquid".
 Counterfeit cannabis buds: Hemp buds (or low-potency cannabis buds) laced with synthetic cannabinoids.
 Counterfeit cannabis edible: The Florida Poison Information Center in Jacksonville warned parents in September 2020 that the number of people poisoned by fake marijuana edibles and candies has tripled.
 Counterfeit hash oil: Several school kids in Greater Manchester collapsed after vaping synthetic cannabinoids mis-sold as THC vape.
 Counterfeit hashish: In 2020 counterfeit hashish were found to contain 4F-MDMB-BINACA and 5F-MDMB-PINACA (5F-ADB).

Less common psychoactive substances used to adulterate cannabis:
 Erectile dysfunction drugs: In the Netherlands two chemical analogs of Sildenafil (Viagra) were found in adulterated marijuana.
 Methamphetamine: psychiatrist Dr Bill MacEwan believes that drug dealers in British Columbia are intentionally lacing cannabis with methamphetamine to make it more addictive. He had some psychiatric patients that claimed they only smoked pot but their drug tests were positive for methamphetamine use.
 PCP: Rarely, cannabis (especially that of low quality) is laced with PCP, particularly in the United States.  However, it is not always done surreptitiously.  Dealers who do so often (but not always) advertise their wares as being "enhanced" with other substances, and charge more money than they would otherwise, even if they do not say exactly what the lacing agents are.  Such concoctions are often called "fry", "wet", "illy", "sherm", "water-water", "dust(ed)", "super weed", "grecodine" or other names.

Weight cutting agents:
 Binding substances: Sometimes cannabis is adulterated with other binding substances including industrial glues such as neoprene, tar, ammonia, bitumen, petroleum-derived hydrocarbons, dog food or even human or animal excrement. to make it cheaper, thus being of poorer quality. 
 Sand, sugar, brix fertilizers, hair spray, fertilizers, pesticides and fungicides.
 Microscopic glass beads: Cannabis buds was found to be contaminated with glass beads in 2007, known as gris weed.
 Lead: In 2008, 30 German teenagers were hospitalized after the marijuana which they smoked was found to have been contaminated with lead (presumably metallic lead particles), which was added in order to increase its weight.
 Shoe polish: Hash has been cut with shoe polish.
 Vitamin E acetate: Although harmless when used orally, high levels of the substance cause vaping-associated pulmonary injury when inhaled.

Ecstasy
Black market ecstasy pills are frequently found to contain other drugs in place of or in addition to methylenedioxymethylamphetamine (MDMA).  Since the slang term "ecstasy" usually refers only to MDMA, any pill which contains other compounds may be considered adulterated. 3,4-Methylenedioxyamphetamine (MDA), methylenedioxyethamphetamine (MDEA), amphetamine, methylamphetamine, benzylpiperazine (BZP), trifluoromethylphenylpiperazine (TFMPP), caffeine, ephedrine, pseudoephedrine, and dextromethorphan (DXM) are all commonly found in pills being sold as ecstasy.  Less common drugs in ecstasy include diphenhydramine, acetaminophen, 5-MeO-DiPT, 2C-B, procaine, and phencyclidine (PCP). Ecstasy pills sometimes contain dimethylamylamine to increase its stimulant effects. Ecstasy pills might also contain a low dose of 2C-I to potentiate its euphoric effects. Pharmaceutical pills are sometimes sold as ecstasy, as well as pills that contain no psychoactive chemicals at all. Ecstasy sometimes  contains 10 mg to 20 mg of baclofen to reduce overheating caused by ecstasy. para-Methoxyamphetamine (PMA or "Dr. Death", a drug that causes so much overheating that it can kill within 40 minutes) is sometimes sold as ecstasy. There is one published case of an ecstasy tablet being adulterated with 8 mg of strychnine, a toxic alkaloid which was used in very low doses (less than 1 mg) as a stimulant and performance-enhancing drug in the past. Recently, several groups advocating for drug safety through education have made reagent testing products available to confirm what substances there are.

LSD
LSD is virtually never laced with other chemicals, but other lysergamides such as ALD-52 are sometimes sold as LSD-25. DOB, DOI, and other closely related drugs are sometimes sold as LSD. Several other highly potent hallucinogens such as Bromo-DragonFLY or 25I-NBOMe can be found in the form of blotters. LSD is also tasteless in normal dosages, so detection is only possible after ingestion or reagent testing. For these reasons, it is not uncommon to find blotters sold as LSD completely devoid of psychoactive substances.

Prescription medication
As the sources of prescription medication on the street are not verifiable through legitimate channels, misrepresentation of prescription medications is a common practice.

Case reports in commercial products

Alcohol
In June 2022, the Dutch Food and Consumer Product Safety Authority warned that the 3-liter champagne bottle from Moët & Chandon Ice Impérial contained MDMA, killing a person in Germany.

Testing

Reagent testing
Reagent testing kits are available online and also sold at some head shops. These kits claim to be able to  identify common adulterants in ecstasy.

Professional lab tests
There are services available for testing the contents of an ecstasy pill that can tell the user what chemicals are contained in the pill and at what ratio. The results are then posted on their website along with every other pill that they have tested. The tests are considered to be highly accurate. Their services were at one time free, but when they ran out of funding they had to charge a fee for every pill tested.

See also
 Darknet market
 Date rape drug
 Drug checking
 Isopropylbenzylamine
 Pill testing
 Surrogate alcohol

References

Further reading
 Coomber, R. (1997) Vim in the Veins – Fantasy or Fact: The Adulteration of Illicit Drugs, Addiction Research, Vol 5, No. 3. pp. 195-212
 Coomber, R. (1997) ‘Adulteration of Drugs: The Discovery of a Myth', Contemporary Drug Problems, Vol 24, No. 2. pp. 239-271

Drug culture
Adulteration